Morbid Latenight Show is the first studio album by Norwegian singer-songwriter Bertine Zetlitz and was released on March 2, 1998.　Japan was pre-release on January 28, 1998.

Track listing

Chart positions

References

1998 debut albums
Bertine Zetlitz albums